Love at Absolute Zero is the debut album by the indie pop band My Favorite, released on Double Agent in 1999. The subject matter included the end of new wave, the new millennium, and growing up in suburban Long Island, New York.

Critical reception
AllMusic wrote that the album "translates palpable pre-millennial tension into neon-lit synthesizer drama—recalling the heyday of the new wave with none of the irony which sinks like-minded retro-futurists from Romania to the Rentals." Trouser Press called it "an excellent debut, nostalgic but forward-looking at the same time."

Track listing
 Absolute Zero
 Absolute Beginners Again
 17 Berlin
 The Truth About Lake Ronkonkama
 Let's Stay Alive
 Go Kid Go
 Modulate
 Party Crashers
 Between Cafes
 The Informers
 Working Class Jacket
 You Belong With Us

References

1999 albums
My Favorite albums